Martin Kristjansen (born 12 November 1977) is a Danish lightweight boxer from Slagelse, Denmark. He is a former WBO inter-continental lightweight champion.

Kristjansen was ranked first in the WBO Lightweight rankings when he fought the third ranked British Lightweight Amir Khan on 5 April 2008 in a title eliminator. After an onslaught from Khan in the seventh round, the referee stopped the fight with the Dane unable to defend himself.

External links
 
 Martin Kristjansen's profile, www.scandinavian-boxing-rankings.dk

1977 births
Living people
People from Slagelse
Danish male boxers
Lightweight boxers
Sportspeople from Region Zealand